Worrill is a surname. Notable people with the surname include:

Charles W. Worrill (1887–1972), American judge
Conrad Worrill (1941–2020), African-American writer, educator, activist, and talk show host

See also
 Worrell